Carolyn Partridge is an American politician who has served in the Vermont House of Representatives since 1999.

References

20th-century American politicians
20th-century American women politicians
21st-century American politicians
21st-century American women politicians
Democratic Party members of the Vermont House of Representatives
Women state legislators in Vermont
New York University alumni
Living people
Year of birth missing (living people)
Politicians from Hackensack, New Jersey